Decussata may refer to:
 Decussata (alga), a diatom genus in the family Naviculaceae
 Decussata (butterfly), a butterfly genus in the family Lycaenidae